Clubland was a Swedish house music act assembled in 1990 by BTECH label boss/producer Jan Ekholm and British duo Dave Rawlings and Ronnie Herel of Quartz. British musician Morgan King joined them later as a songwriter. Lead vocals for the first album Themes from Outer Clubland were variously performed by the American hip house duo 2 in a Room, British rapper Stepz, and Swedish singers Zemya Hamilton and Kayo Shekoni. In 1991, Ekholm reformed the act with members now comprising singer Zemya Hamilton and musician Morgan King.

Biography
Between 1991 and 1992, five songs charted on the US Billboard Hot Dance Music/Club Play chart, with three of those hitting number-one: "Let's Get Busy" (credited to Clubland featuring Quartz) (1990), "Hold On (Tighter to Love)" (1992) and "Hypnotized" (1992). Another single, "Set Me Free", hit number-one on the US Hot Dance Singles Sales chart and number 2 on the Hot Dance Music/Club Play chart.  In 1993, they won a Swedish Grammy for Best Album with their second album, Adventures Beyond Clubland.

Zemya Hamilton (Zemya Sylveta Larsson Auna) died on 24 December 2015 from multiple sclerosis, aged 50.

Discography

Albums
 Themes from Outer Clubland (1991)
 Clubland featuring Zemya Hamilton (1992)
 Adventures Beyond Clubland (1992)
 Secrets of Inner Clubland (Clubland featuring Zemya Hamilton) (1995)

Singles

See also
List of number-one dance hits (United States)
List of artists who reached number one on the US Dance chart

References

External links
Official website for Clubland and their label BTECH

Discography at Discogs.com

Swedish house music groups
English house music groups
Geffen Records artists
Island Records artists
English-language singers from Sweden